Chilochromopsis is a genus of moths of the family Crambidae. It contains only one species, Chilochromopsis sceletogramma, which is found in Mexico, Costa Rica and Cuba.

References

Spilomelinae
Monotypic moth genera
Moths of North America
Crambidae genera
Taxa named by Eugene G. Munroe